Peter Basil Carter (10 April 1921 – 16 September 2004) was a Fellow and Tutor in Law at Wadham College, Oxford.

Carter was educated at Loughborough Grammar School and Oriel College, Oxford where he obtained a double first.  He joined the British Army in 1941, and was awarded Croix de Guerre with silver star by France for actions in Normandy.  He was called to the Bar by the Middle Temple in 1947 and was a fellow of Wadham College from 1949 until his retirement in 1988. Carter also taught at the Inns of Court School of Law in London and was a visiting professor of law at institutions in Australia, Canada and the United States.  He was made an honorary bencher of the Middle Temple in 1981 and honorary QC in 1990.

Bibliography
 Cases and statutes on evidence, London, Sweet & Maxwell, 1992

External links
 Times Obituary 

People educated at Loughborough Grammar School
Fellows of Wadham College, Oxford
Alumni of Oriel College, Oxford
Recipients of the Croix de Guerre 1939–1945 (France)
1921 births
2004 deaths
Place of birth missing
Place of death missing
Members of the Middle Temple
British barristers
British legal scholars
British Army personnel of World War II
Legal scholars of the University of Oxford
Honorary King's Counsel